The Myanmar Dental Association (Yangon Region) (MDA-Ygn) is a professional association established in 1994 which has more than 500 members. The association organizes Yangon Dental Festival every year. It also arranges many continuous dental education program for Myanmar dentists and charity dental treatments for Myanmar people. Myanmar Dental Association and Myanmar Dental Council are the only two professional organizations for Myanmar Dentists.

Leadership
Past presidents of the organisation include:
 Naing Htun Thwin (2016–2019)
 Naing Htun Thwin (2019–present)

See also
 Dentistry
 University of Dental Medicine, Mandalay
 University of Dental Medicine, Yangon
 Myanmar Dental Association
 Myanmar Dental Council

References

Healthcare in Myanmar